Classical Philology is a peer-reviewed academic journal established in 1906. It is published by the University of Chicago Press and covers all aspects of Graeco-Roman antiquity, including literature, languages, anthropology, history, social life, philosophy, religion, art, material culture, and the history of classical studies. The editor-in-chief is Sarah Nooter.

External links 
 
 Classical Philology at the Department of Classics, Division of the Humanities, University of Chicago

Classics journals
University of Chicago Press academic journals
Quarterly journals
English-language journals
Publications established in 1906
1906 establishments in Illinois